Boyhood Daze is a 1957 Warner Bros. Merrie Melodies cartoon directed by Chuck Jones. The script was written by Michael Maltese, and the film score was composed by Milt Franklyn. The film was produced by Edward Selzer. The voices were provided by Dick Beals, Daws Butler and Marian Richman. It contains the science fiction element of an alien invasion.

The short was released on September 20, 1957, and features young boy Ralph Phillips. Following From A to Z-Z-Z-Z (1954), it is one of two cartoons in which he stars.

Plot 
The cartoon starts with a baseball going through a window, breaking it, and Ralph exclaiming: "Ohhh nooo!"  His mother sends him up to his bedroom until his father gets home.

Up in his room, he broods over his mistake and tries to imagine himself as a hero, first by imagining himself as a famous explorer in Africa to rescue his parents from a native tribe, then tells his father to go to his room for playing in Africa and tells his mother his insurance will cover the window and to buy a catcher's mitt with the rest.

He is then seen making paper airplanes, and wishing he was a "jet ace or something."  He then is imagining himself as an Air Force pilot who thwarts a Martian invasion and is a national hero.

His third dream occurs after he hears his dad come home and can hear the distant talking of both of his parents.  His imagines himself as a convict in a jail cell. A whispering voice repeats: "They're coming to get'cha, Phillips. They're coming to get'cha."  He steps down, crushes out a cigarette he was apparently smoking, and faces the door like a man.  The cell door opens and a silhouetted person with a booming voice says: "You're going to have to pay for this, Ralph Phillips!"

Back in reality, it turns out to be his rather gentle-demeaning father who informs Ralph that the window repair is coming out of his allowance, then lets him go outside to play.

As he runs back outside with a baseball bat and glove, he stops when he sees a cherry tree in the yard, then notices a hatchet.  In the next scene he is walking towards the tree with the hatchet, and he turns into a young George Washington as the cartoon irises out.

Reception
Motion Picture Exhibitor reviewed the short on August 21, 1957: "This shows the vivid creation of Ralph, a little boy send to bed for being naughty... The ultra-modern drawings are excellent, but this is not very funny."

Home media
VHS - Looney Tunes Collectors Edition Volume 2: Running Amuck
Laserdisc - Looney Tunes: Assorted Nuts
DVD - Looney Tunes Golden Collection: Volume 6 (bonus feature)

See also
 List of American films of 1957
Looney Tunes and Merrie Melodies filmography (1950–1959)

References

External links 
 
 
 Ralph Phillips at Don Markstein's Toonopedia. Archived from the original on November 4, 2016.

1950s English-language films
1957 animated films
1957 short films
1950s science fiction films
Alien invasions in films
Films set in Africa
Merrie Melodies short films
Warner Bros. Cartoons animated short films
Short films directed by Chuck Jones
1950s Warner Bros. animated short films
Films scored by Milt Franklyn
Films with screenplays by Michael Maltese
Animated films about children
Films about dreams
Films about the United States Air Force
Mars in film
Cultural depictions of George Washington
Films produced by Edward Selzer
American animated short films